Niphad Assembly constituency is one of the 288 Vidhan Sabha (legislative assembly) constituencies of Maharashtra state in western India.

Overview
It is a part of the Dindori (Lok Sabha constituency)(ST) along with five other assembly constituencies, viz Kalvan Assembly constituency, Chandvad Assembly constituency, Yevla Assembly constituency, Nandgaon Assembly constituency, and Dindori (Maharasthra Assembly constituency)

Members of Legislative Assembly
 1990: Malojirao Sadashiv Mogal, INC
 1995: Raosaheb Bhaurao Kadam, Shiv Sena
 1999: Mandakini Raosaheb Kadam, Shiv Sena
 2004: Dilip Bankar, NCP
 2009: Anil Kadam, Shiv Sena
 2014: Anil Kadam, Shiv Sena
 2019: Dilip Bankar, NCP

Election results

Assembly Elections 2004

Assembly Elections 2009

Assembly Elections 2014

See also
 Niphad
 List of constituencies of the Maharashtra Vidhan Sabha

References

Assembly constituencies of Nashik district
Assembly constituencies of Maharashtra